The Sunday Magazine is a Canadian news and current affairs radio show, hosted by Piya Chattopadhyay on CBC Radio One. The program premiered on September 13, 2020, replacing The Sunday Edition, but retains a similar format of interviews and documentary reports on political, social and cultural topics in the news.

At the beginning of each month, the show has a recurring game segment called "That's Puzzling" where contestants featuring the host, various CBC personalities, and select viewers who won the chance by completing a word challenge, compete in word games.

The program airs from 9 to 11 a.m. on Sunday mornings, and an abbreviated edition is rebroadcast at midnight.

References

CBC Radio One programs
2020 radio programme debuts
Canadian talk radio programs